Kanta Kumari Bhatnagar (Hindi: कान्ता भटनागर   – 13 August 2011) was a judge and human rights activist in India. Bhatnagar was the first woman to become a Chief Justice of the Madras High Court and was the first chairperson of the Rajasthan State Human Rights Commission.

She was the prominent Woman Judge in Rajasthan.

Biography

Bhatnagar worked as a judge in Rajasthan in 1968. She became the Chief Justice of the Madras High Court in June 1992. She was the first woman to serve as chief justice of that court and held that post for around five months.

Bhatnagar became the first chair of the Rajasthan State Human Rights Commission in 2000.

She died at age 81 of a heart attack in Udaipur on 13 August 2011.

References 

2011 deaths
People from Udaipur
Indian human rights activists
Chief Justices of the Madras High Court
Scholars from Rajasthan
Women in Rajasthan politics
20th-century Indian judges
20th-century Indian politicians
20th-century Indian women politicians
Women in Tamil Nadu politics
Women educators from Rajasthan
Educators from Rajasthan
Year of birth uncertain
20th-century Indian women judges